In computing, deterministic memory is computer memory which contains values that can be depended on from access to access. The term is also used in conjunction with  achieving real-time functionality, especially in conjunction with embedded processor applications.

See also 
 Embedded system
 Memory management
 Real-time computing

External links 
 Design Patterns for Real-Time Computer Music Systems
 Exploring memory architectures: pillars of processing performance
 Harnessing parallelism from video-processing DSPs
 Memory Management
 Persistency Made Easy 

Computer memory